Trypanaresta is a genus of tephritid  or fruit flies in the family Tephritidae.

Species
Trypanaresta ameghinoi (Brèthes, 1908)
Trypanaresta coelestina (Hering, 1938)
Trypanaresta delicatella (Blanchard, 1854)
Trypanaresta difficilis (Malloch, 1933)
Trypanaresta dolores (Hering, 1938)
Trypanaresta flava (Adams, 1904)
Trypanaresta hestiae (Hendel, 1914)
Trypanaresta imitatrix (Hering, 1938)
Trypanaresta miseta (Hering, 1938)
Trypanaresta plagiata (Blanchard, 1854)
Trypanaresta scutellata (Séguy, 1933)
Trypanaresta setulosa (Malloch, 1933)
Trypanaresta subaster (Malloch, 1933)
Trypanaresta suspecta (Malloch, 1933)
Trypanaresta thomsoni (Hendel, 1914)
Trypanaresta titschacki Hering, 1941
Trypanaresta valdesiana Gandolfo & Norrbom, 1997

References

Tephritinae
Tephritidae genera
Diptera of South America
Diptera of North America